The name Soulik has been used to name four tropical cyclones in the northwestern Pacific Ocean. The name was contributed by the Federated States of Micronesia and is the traditional title of chiefs on Pohnpei.
 Typhoon Soulik (2000) (T0023, 34W, Welpring) – a December storm that never threatened land.
 Typhoon Soulik (2006) (T0618, 21W) – affected the Marianas and Volcano Islands.
 Typhoon Soulik (2013) (T1307, 07W, Huaning) – struck Taiwan and China.
Typhoon Soulik (2018) (T1819, 22W), a deadly and strong typhoon that affected Japan

References

Pacific typhoon set index articles